The Yezo sika deer (Cervus nippon yesoensis, Ainu: ユク yuk) is one of the many subspecies of the sika deer. The sika that inhabit the island of Hokkaido are indigenous, although it is not known whether they originated there or migrated from the main island of Japan. It is thought that they may have traveled across the strait between the islands. Genetic study has shown that the separation of the sika population occurred less than half a million years ago. It is possible that northern sika deer may be more closely related to yezo sika deer than to other sika deer. The indigenous Ainu people of Hokkaido have hunted them for centuries and relied on them as a major food source.

The Hokkaido sika is one of the largest of the sika species with large stags approaching and sometimes exceeding 200 kg in the fall. They also sport the largest antlers with lengths often over 35 inches with the longest recorded specimen being 44 inches. By SCI measurement the Hokkaido sika produces the highest scores, although very few have been listed.

References

Mammals of Asia